Chipata Central is a constituency of the National Assembly of Zambia. It covers the city of Chipata in Chipata District of Eastern Province.

Chipata Central has a population of 206,552.

List of MPs

References

Constituencies of the National Assembly of Zambia
1964 establishments in Zambia
Constituencies established in 1964